Bálint Szeghalmi (born 16 September 1980) is a Hungarian former professional racing cyclist.

Major results
2007
 1st  Road race, National Road Championships
 1st Stage 2 Tour de Pécs
 4th Overall Tour de Hongrie
2009
 1st Stage 2 Turul Dobrogei
 2nd Banja Luka–Belgrade II
 7th GP Betonexpressz 2000
2010
 1st Stage 2 Tolna Regio Kupa
 2nd Road race, National Road Championships
2011
 3rd Time trial, National Road Championships

References

External links

1980 births
Living people
Hungarian male cyclists
Cyclists from Budapest